The following is a list of notable deaths in April 2015.

Entries for each day are listed alphabetically by surname. A typical entry lists information in the following sequence:
Name, age, country of citizenship and reason for notability, established cause of death, reference.

April 2015

1
Dave Ball, 65, British musician (Procol Harum), colorectal cancer.
Roel Cortez, 47, Filipino singer-songwriter, colon cancer.
Peter Diamandopoulos, 86, Greek-born American academic, President of Adelphi University (1985–1997).
Johnny Gardiner, 92, Canadian CFL football player (Winnipeg Blue Bombers).
John Paul Hammerschmidt, 92, American politician, member of the US House of Representatives from Arkansas's 3rd district (1967–1993), heart and respiratory failure.
Sir John Ingram, 90, New Zealand engineer and businessman.
Zdravko-Ćiro Kovačić, 89, Croatian water polo player, Olympic silver medalist for Yugoslavia (1952, 1956).
Eddie LeBaron, 85, American football player (Washington Redskins, Dallas Cowboys).
Cynthia Lennon, 75, British author, cancer.
Raul Loya, 76, American workers' rights activist.
Misao Okawa, 117, Japanese supercentenarian, world's oldest living person.
Nicolae Rainea, 81, Romanian football referee (FIFA World Cup (1974, 1978, 1982), UEFA Euro 1980 Final), pulmonary edema.
Paul D. Reynolds, 52, Canadian investment banker, CEO of Canaccord Genuity.
J. D. Smith, 83, American football player (San Francisco 49ers).
Joseph Sweda, 89, American politician.
Robert Walker, 54, Canadian-born American animator and director (Brother Bear, Aladdin, The Lion King), heart attack.
Muhammadu Dikko Yusufu, 84, Nigerian politician and police officer, Inspector General of the Police (1976–1979).

2
Paule Anglim, 92, Canadian-born American art dealer (Gallery Paule Anglim).
Luis Delgado Aparicio, 74, Peruvian politician, MP (1995–2001), pancreatic cancer.
Natalia Bobrova, 36, Russian gymnast, stomach cancer.
Mick Brown, 77, New Zealand jurist.
Per Vilhelm Brüel, 100, Danish engineer.
Wally Cassell, 103, Italian-born American actor (White Heat).
Tom Coyne, 84, British news broadcaster and television presenter (Top Gear).
James de Beaujeu Domville, 81, French-born Canadian theatrical producer.
William Benedict Friend, 83, American Roman Catholic prelate, Bishop of Alexandria-Shreveport (1982–1986) and Shreveport (1986–2006).
Raúl Gorriti, 58, Peruvian footballer (national team).
Robert Blair Kaiser, 84, American journalist.
Dennis Marks, 66, British television producer and music director.
Ben Meisner, 76, Canadian broadcaster (CKPG), cancer.
Norman H. Nie, 72, American social scientist, lung cancer.
Hayley Okines, 17, British progeria campaigner, pneumonia.
Manoel de Oliveira, 106, Portuguese film director and screenwriter, heart failure.
Stanisław Pestka, 85, Polish Kashubian poet.
Joseph L. Reid, 92, American oceanographer.
Barbara Sass, 78, Polish film director and screenwriter.
Olga Sawicka, 83, Polish dancer and choreographer.
Doug Sax, 79, American audio mastering engineer, cancer.
Robert H. Schuller, 88, American televangelist (Hour of Power).
Alberto Ricardo da Silva, 71, East Timorese Roman Catholic prelate, Bishop of Díli (2004–2015).
Steve Stevaert, 60, Belgian politician, Chairman of the SP.a (2003–2005), Governor of Limburg (2005–2009).
Abdelhadi Tazi, 94, Moroccan scholar and diplomat.
Tom Towles, 65, American actor (Henry: Portrait of a Serial Killer, Miami Vice, The Rock), complications from a stroke.
Jerzy Treder, 72, Polish philologist.
Eugene Vielle, 101, British air force officer and inventor.

3
Milton Berkes, 90, American politician.
Michael Birkett, 2nd Baron Birkett, 85, British hereditary peer and film producer.
Nigel Boocock, 77, British speedway rider.
Sarah Brady, 73, American gun control campaigner, pneumonia.
Bob Burns, 64, American drummer (Lynyrd Skynyrd), traffic collision.
Sam Cathcart, 90, American football player (San Francisco 49ers), cancer.
John Darnton, 96, American football coach (Adrian Bulldogs).
Traute Foresti, 100, Austrian poet and actress.
Rocío García Gaytán, 55, Mexican politician, MP (1997–2000), cancer.
Osea Gavidi, 71, Fijian politician, indigenous chief and secessionist leader.
Mathias Gnädinger, 74, Swiss actor (The Boat Is Full, Journey of Hope), cardiac complications and acute respiratory distress syndrome.
Paul Grigoriu, 70, Romanian radio personality (SRR).
Michael Jandreau, 71, American Native leader, chairman of the Lower Brulé Sioux tribe, pneumonia and heart disease.
Kayahan, 66, Turkish musician, cancer.
Terdell Middleton, 59, American football player (Green Bay Packers).
Vivian Nathan, 98, American actress (Klute).
Mpok Nori, 84, Indonesian comedian.
Algirdas Vaclovas Patackas, 71, Lithuanian politician and poet, signatory of the 1990 Act of the Re-Establishment of the State of Lithuania.
Luis María Pérez de Onraíta, 81, Spanish-born Angolan Roman Catholic prelate, Archbishop of Malanje (1998–2012).
Chris Plumridge, 70, British golf writer.
Andrew Porter, 86, British music critic, pneumonia.
Christopher Reynolds, 92, British linguist.
Robert Rietti, 92, British-born Italian actor (Hannibal, The Omen).
Charlie Sumner, 84, American football player (Chicago Bears).
Shmuel Wosner, 101, Austrian-born Israeli Haredi rabbi.

4
Jaroslav Balcar, 62, Czechoslovak Olympic ski jumper (1976).
Ramón Barreto, 75, Uruguayan football referee (1974 FIFA World Cup).
Zdeněk Čihák, 82, Czech Olympic athlete.
Bill Ellerington, 91, English footballer (Southampton).
John Gogo, 83, Canadian politician.
Jamaluddin Jarjis, 63, Malaysian politician, MP for Rompin (since 1990), helicopter crash.
Elmer Lach, 97, Canadian Hall of Fame ice hockey player (Montreal Canadiens), stroke.
Donald N. Levine, 83, American sociologist.
Ira Lewis, 82, American actor and playwright (Chinese Coffee), complications following open heart surgery.
Elie Naasan, 83, Lebanese Olympic wrestler.
Ioan Pușcaș, 82, Romanian gastroenterologist.
Sir John Read, 97, British executive.
Klaus Rifbjerg, 83, Danish writer (Anna, I, Anna), recipient of the Nordic Council's Literature Prize (1970).
Lisa Simon, 64, American director, producer and production assistant (Sesame Street, Wonder Pets, Blue Jasmine).
Marjorie Townsend, 85, American electrical engineer.
Dick Wood, 79, American football player (New York Jets).

5
Bauyrzhan Baimukhammedov, 67, Kazakh football player and coach.
Barbara Bergmann, 87, American feminist economist.
Fredric Brandt, 65, American dermatologist, suicide by hanging.
Juan Carlos Cáceres, 79, Argentine tango musician and painter, cancer.
Hugh Delano, 81, American sports journalist.
Richard Dysart, 86, American actor (L.A. Law, Being There, The Thing), Emmy winner (1992), cancer.
Lalit Kishore Chaturvedi, 84, Indian politician.
Ramnath Dhakal, 52, Nepalese politician, swine flu.
Maurice Fenner, 86, English cricketer.
Victor Gotbaum, 93, American labor leader, heart attack.
Tony Hutton, 82, British Royal Navy officer, organized the refugee evacuation effort following the Turkish invasion of Cyprus.
Sid Ali Kouiret, 82, Algerian actor.
Naken Kyrykbaev, 39, Kazakh footballer (Taraz).
Richard LaSalle, 97, American film composer.
Anne-Claude Leflaive, 59, French winemaker, cancer.
Norman B. Leventhal, 97, American property developer.
Don Looney, 98, American football player (Philadelphia Eagles, Pittsburgh Steelers).
Akira Machida, 78, Japanese judge, Chief Justice of the Supreme Court (2002–2006).
Sargy Mann, 77, British painter.
Gordon Moyes, 76, Australian radio evangelist and politician, member of the New South Wales Legislative Council (2002–2011).
Louis Miles Muggleton, 92, South African-born British physicist.
John Patton, 84, American politician.
Claudio Prieto, 80, Spanish composer.
Jehan Rajab, 81, Kuwaiti author.
Steve Rickard, 85, New Zealand professional wrestler.
Lon Simmons, 91, American sports broadcaster.
Francesco Smalto, 87, Italian fashion designer.
Gardner C. Taylor, 96, American preacher and civil rights activist.
Julie Wilson, 90, American singer and actress, stroke complications.
Yacoub Zaiadeen, 95, Jordanian politician.

6
Theodosios Balafas, 91, Greek Olympic pole vaulter (1948, 1952).
Hardijs Baumanis, 47, Latvian diplomat, Ambassador to Azerbaijan (since 2010) and Lithuania.
Giovanni Berlinguer, 90, Italian politician, MEP (2004–2009).
James Best, 88, American actor (The Dukes of Hazzard, Ride Lonesome, The Twilight Zone), pneumonia.
Ray Charles, 96, American musician (The Perry Como Show, The Muppet Show), cancer.
Paul Dearing, 73, Australian Olympic silver medallist field hockey player (1968) and bronze medallist (1964).
Milton DeLugg, 96, American composer.
Walter H. Haas, 97, American astronomer.
David L. Kaplan, 91, American professor and conductor.
Eugène Moke Motsüri, 99, Congolese Roman Catholic prelate, Auxiliary Bishop of Kinshasa (1970–1991).
Rie Muñoz, 93, American artist, stroke.
Romualdas Ozolas, 76, Lithuanian politician, signatory of the 1990 Act of the Re-Establishment of the State of Lithuania.
John Papit, 86, American football player (Washington Redskins, Green Bay Packers), stroke.
Art Powell, 78, American football player (Oakland Raiders).
Ben Powers, 64, American actor (Good Times), liver cancer.
Dollard St. Laurent, 85, Canadian ice hockey player (Montreal Canadiens, Chicago Blackhawks).
Dave Ulliott, 61, English professional poker player, colon cancer.
Alan Wilson, 94, English cricketer (Lancashire).

7
Patrick H. Adkins, 67, American fantasy author.
Tim Babcock, 95, American politician, Governor of Montana (1962–1969).
Mohammad Bahr al-Ulloum, 88, Iraqi Shi'a Islamic leader and politician.
José Capellán, 34, American baseball player (Milwaukee Brewers, Detroit Tigers), heart attack.
Harry Dowd, 76, English footballer (Manchester City).
Eugene Louis Faccuito, 90, American dancer and choreographer.
Stan Freberg, 88, American comedian and voice actor (Looney Tunes, Lady and the Tramp, Garfield and Friends), pneumonia.
Edward Gallenstein, 92, American wood carver and magazine editor (Chip Chats).
Jean Germain, 67, French politician, Mayor of Tours (1995–2014), suicide by gunshot.
Richard Henyekane, 31, South African footballer, traffic collision.
Kardam, Prince of Turnovo, 52, Bulgarian royal, lung infection.
Stanley Kutler, 80, American historian.
Geoffrey Lewis, 79, American actor (High Plains Drifter, Maverick, The Lawnmower Man), heart attack.
Boonkua Lourvanij, 84, Thai Olympic shooter.
Betty Lucas, 90, Australian actress (Prisoner, Taurus Rising, Richmond Hill).
Dickie Owen, 88, British actor (Zulu, The Curse of the Mummy's Tomb, Chitty Chitty Bang Bang).
Richard F. Post, 96, American physicist.
Maria Luisa Poumaillou, 61, Venezuelan-born French fashion consultant.
James B. Rhoads, 86, American public servant, Archivist of the United States (1968–1979).
Kalmanje Jagannatha Shetty, 78, Indian judge.
Donald Smith, 81, English cricket player (Cheshire).
Rich Szaro, 67, Polish-born American football player (New Orleans Saints, New York Jets).
Janet Turner, 78, British architectural lighting designer.
Torrey Ward, 36, American basketball coach, plane crash.
Naomi Wilzig, 80, American writer and museum owner (World Erotic Art Museum Miami).

8
Jean-Louis Crémieux-Brilhac, 98, French resistance member, civil servant and historian.
Abraham Eraly, 80, Indian historian and magazine editor.
Harry K. Fukuhara, 95, American army officer.
Nagore E. M. Hanifa, 89, Indian politician and playback singer.
Willie Honicutt, 82, American Negro league baseball player.
Graham Howarth, 99, English entomologist.
Rayson Huang, 94, Chinese chemist, vice-chancellor of the University of Hong Kong (1972–1986).
Jayakanthan, 80, Indian Tamil author.
Sergei Lashchenko, 27, Ukrainian kickboxer, shot.
David Laventhol, 81, American newspaper editor and publisher, Parkinson's disease.
Nan Inger Östman, 92, Swedish children's book author.
Billy Ronson, 58, English footballer (Blackpool).
Giorgio Salvini, 94, Italian physicist and politician, Minister of University, Scientific Research and Technology (1995–1996).
Hermann Schweppenhäuser, 87, German philosopher.
Joel Shankle, 82, American hurdler, Olympic bronze medalist (1956).
Joel Spira, 88, American inventor (solid-state lamp dimmer), co-founder of Lutron Electronics Company, heart attack.
Hilde Stavik, 52, Norwegian long-distance runner, cancer.
Udugama Sri Buddharakkitha Thero, 85, Sri Lankan Buddhist monk.
Ion Trewin, 71, British editor, publisher and author.
Lars Tunbjörk, 59, Swedish photographer.
Jean-Claude Turcotte, 78, Canadian Roman Catholic cardinal, Archbishop of Montreal (1990–2012).
Ole Wackström, 82, Finnish Olympic racing cyclist (1968, 1972).

9
Paul Almond, 83, Canadian filmmaker (The Act of the Heart, Journey, Isabel) and television director (Seven Up!), heart disease.
Betty Tackaberry Blake, 94, American WWII aviator.
Nina Companeez, 77, French film director.
Alexander Dalgarno, 87, British physicist.
Ivan Doig, 75, American author, multiple myeloma.
Moira Gemmill, 55, British design director (Victoria and Albert Museum), traffic collision.
Jurgen Gothe, 70, German-born Canadian radio broadcaster (DiscDrive).
Charles Hamel, 84, American congressional aide and oil industry whistleblower.
Ray Harm, 87, American artist, prostate cancer.
Ghulam Rasool Kar, 94, Indian politician.
Kuo Ting-tsai, 78, Taiwanese politician, MLY (1993–2002), complications of cancer.
Bob McLean, 67, Australian winemaker, liver cancer.
Hrushikesh Moolgavkar, 94, Indian air chief marshal and Chief of Air Staff (1976–1978).
Vera Pap, 59, Hungarian actress.
Ron Payne, 89, Australian politician, member of the South Australian House of Assembly for Mitchell (1970–1989).
Elmo Noel Joseph Perera, 82, Sri Lankan Roman Catholic prelate, Auxiliary Bishop (1992–1995) and Bishop of Galle (1995–2004).
Narra Raghava Reddy, 92, Indian politician.
Hans Ring, 86, Swedish Olympic athlete.
Margaret Rule, 86, British archaeologist.
João Alves dos Santos, 58, Brazilian Roman Catholic prelate, Bishop of Paranaguá (since 2006).
Rafael Soriano, 94, Cuban painter.
Alex Soto, 49, Puerto Rican actor and drag queen, heart attack.
Rogvold Sukhoverko, 74, Russian film and voice actor.
Johan B. Steen, 81, Norwegian biologist.
Tut Taylor, 91, American bluegrass musician (The Great Dobro Sessions).
John Toohey, 85, Australian jurist, High Court Justice (1987–1998).
Tsien Tsuen-hsuin, 105, Chinese-born American sinologist, professor, and librarian.
Sascha Weidner, 40, German artist, heart failure.

10
Andrzej Ajnenkiel, 84, Polish historian.
Richie Benaud, 84, Australian cricket captain and television commentator, skin cancer.
Raúl Héctor Castro, 98, Mexican-born American politician and diplomat, Governor of Arizona (1975–1977), Ambassador to El Salvador (1964–1968), Bolivia (1968–1969) and Argentina (1977–1980).
David Dank, 76, American politician, member of Oklahoma House of Representatives (since 2007), heart attack.
Peter de Giles, 88, British Olympic rower.
Desmond Digby, 82, New Zealand-born Australian theatre designer, children's book illustrator and painter.
Waltraud Falk, 85, German economist.
Eduardo Gauggel Medina, 48, Honduran lawyer and politician, MP (since 2014), shot.
Eduardo Gauggel Rivas, 61, Honduran lawyer and politician, member of the Supreme Court (1994–1998), shot.
Ray Graves, 96, American football player and coach.
Ronald Hambleton, 97, English-born Canadian broadcaster and music critic (Toronto Star).
Bárbara Heliodora, 91, Brazilian theatre critic.
Lauren Hill, 19, American college basketball player, pediatric cancer advocate, brain cancer.
Dorothy Jelicich, 87, New Zealand politician, MP for Hamilton West (1972–75).
Jin Youzhi, 96, Chinese royal.
Rustin R. Kimsey, 79, American prelate, Episcopal Bishop of Eastern Oregon.
Judith Malina, 88, German-born American actress (Dog Day Afternoon, Awakenings, The Addams Family) and director, lung disease.
Keith McCormack, 74, American singer and songwriter ("Sugar Shack"), stroke.
Bobby Moore, 56, American baseball player (San Francisco Giants).
Jim Mutscheller, 85, American football player (Baltimore Colts), kidney failure.
William S. Powell, 95, American historian.
Rocco Quattrocchi, 88, American politician, member of the Rhode Island Senate and House of Representatives.
Rose Francine Rogombé, 72, Gabonese politician, Acting President (2009).
Ray Treacy, 68, Irish footballer (Charlton Athletic).
Peter Walsh, 80, Australian politician, Minister for Finance (1984–1990), Senator for Western Australia (1974–1993).

11
Charlie Beasley, 69, American basketball player.
Martin Tore Bjørndal, 70, Norwegian diplomat.
Nico Frijda, 87, Dutch psychologist.
Jimmy Gunn, 66, American football player (Chicago Bears), heart failure.
Guy Hannen, 90, British WWII army officer and auctioneer.
Helen Anne Henderson, 68, Canadian journalist and disability rights activist, complications from cancer.
Peter Jones, 95, British WWII army officer.
Muhammad Kamaruzzaman, 62, Bangladeshi politician and convicted war criminal, execution by hanging.
Sheila Kitzinger, 86, British natural childbirth activist.
Janusz Kurczab, 77, Polish Olympic fencer (1960), mountaineer and expedition leader.
François Maspero, 83, French writer and translator.
Viv Nicholson, 79, British football pools winner, complications of a stroke and dementia.
Heino Pulli, 77, Finnish ice hockey player.
Hanut Singh, 81, Indian army officer.
Tekena Tamuno, 83, Nigerian history professor.
Kyle Testerman, 80, American politician, Mayor of Knoxville, Tennessee (1972–1975, 1984–1987).
Levi Watkins, 70, American heart surgeon, complications from a heart attack and a stroke.

12
Ibrahim Sulayman Muhammad Arbaysh, 35, Saudi Arabian suspected terrorist, drone attack.
Aleksey Bochkov, 45, Russian Olympic cyclist (1992).
Paulo Brossard, 90, Brazilian jurist and politician, Minister of Justice (1986–1989), justice of the Supreme Federal Court (1989–1994).
Jože Ciuha, 90, Slovenian painter.
Patrice Dominguez, 65, French tennis player.
Alfred Eick, 99, German U-boat commander.
Bill Etches, 93, British WWII army officer (St Nazaire Raid).
Doug Gregory, 92, British Royal Air Force officer and stunt pilot, hit by car.
Claude Lanthier, 82, Canadian politician, MP for Lasalle (1984–1988).
André Mba Obame, 57, Gabonese politician.
Mario Wallenda, 74, American highwire artiste (The Flying Wallendas).

13
Bruce Alger, 96, American politician, member of the U.S. House of Representatives from Texas's 5th district (1955–1965), heart ailment.
Brice Bosnich, 78, Australian chemist.
Gerald Calabrese, 90, American politician and basketball player (Syracuse Nationals).
Ronnie Carroll, 80, Northern Irish singer and political candidate.
Noël De Pauw, 72, Belgian cyclist.
Tony Eldridge, 91, British Royal Navy officer (Chariot manned torpedo).
Eduardo Galeano, 74, Uruguayan journalist, writer and novelist, lung cancer.
Claire Gordon, 74, British actress (Konga, Beat Girl), brain tumour.
Günter Grass, 87, German novelist (The Tin Drum), Nobel Prize laureate in Literature (1999), lung infection.
Mária Gulácsy, 73, Hungarian fencer, Olympic silver medalist (1968).
Neal Horsley, 70, American anti-abortion activist.
Pat King, 68, Irish Gaelic football player and coach.
Thelma Coyne Long, 96, Australian Hall of Fame tennis player.
Joselyn Alejandra Niño,  20, Mexican suspected assassin, shot.
Neal Nitz, 61, American politician.
Anna-Lisa Ohlsson, 89, Swedish Olympic sprint canoeist (1952).
Bob Pinkalla, 86, American ten-pin bowler, heart failure.
Elizabeth Brown Pryor, 64, American author and historian, traffic collision.
Antônio Alberto Guimarães Rezende, 89, Brazilian Roman Catholic prelate, Bishop of Caetité (1981–2002).
Rex Robinson, 89, British actor (Doctor Who, Yes Minister, Only Fools and Horses).
Haanii Shivraj, 29, Malaysian actress, cancer.
Serhiy Sukhobok, 50, Ukrainian journalist, shot.
Herb Trimpe, 75, American comic book artist (The Incredible Hulk, Thor), co-creator of Wolverine.

14
Norman H. Bangerter, 82, American politician, Governor of Utah (1985–1993), stroke.
Klaus Bednarz, 72, German journalist and writer.
Homaro Cantu, 38, American chef, suicide by hanging.
Sheldon Galbraith, 92, Canadian figure skating coach.
Aref Gholizadeh, 77, Iranian international footballer.
Ameril Umbra Kato, 68, Filipino warlord, leader of Bangsamoro Islamic Freedom Fighters, heart attack.
Kō Kojima, 87, Japanese manga artist, cerebral hemorrhage.
M. Joseph Manning, 90, American politician, member of the Massachusetts House of Representatives (1967–1997).
Zsuzsa Nádor, 87, Hungarian Olympic swimmer.
Leslie Peterson, 91, Canadian lawyer and politician, Attorney General of British Columbia (1968–1972).
Gordon Preston, 89, English mathematician.
Majid Rahnema, 91, Iranian diplomat and politician.
Mark Reeds, 55, Canadian ice hockey player (St. Louis Blues) and coach (Ottawa Senators), pneumonia.
Meir Rosenne, 84, Israeli lawyer and diplomat, Ambassador to France (1979–1983) and United States (1983–1987).
Kevin Rosier, 53, American super heavyweight kickboxing champion and mixed martial artist (UFC), heart attack.
Vilas Sarang, 73, Indian author.
Howie Schumm, 75, Canadian football player (Edmonton Eskimos).
Arnold Schütz, 80, German footballer (Werder Bremen).
Percy Sledge, 74, American R&B singer ("When a Man Loves a Woman"), liver cancer.
Alex Stevens, 79, American actor and stunt performer (Dark Shadows, Superman, Goodfellas).
Buddy Temple, 73, American businessman and politician.
Roberto Tucci, 93, Italian Roman Catholic prelate, President of Vatican Radio (1985–2001), Cardinal-Priest of S. Ignazio di Loyola a Campo Marzio (since 2001).
Kathrine Sorley Walker, 95, English ballet critic.
David Ward-Steinman, 78, American composer and music professor.

15
Sidney Abbott, 77, American feminist activist, fire.
Kinya Aikawa, 80, Japanese actor (Speed Racer, Naruhodo! The World), lung cancer.
Zaur Ardzinba, 65, Abkhazian politician.
Joseph A. Bennett, 47, British actor (The Young Indiana Jones Chronicles), suicide by hanging.
Paul Clark, 67, American poker player.
Jonathan Crombie, 48, Canadian actor (Anne of Green Gables), brain haemorrhage.
Margaret Harrison, 96, Scottish peace campaigner.
Billy Ray Hearn, 85, American record label chairman, heart disease.
John Howard, 94, American optical physicist.
Oleg Kalashnikov, 52, Ukrainian politician, shot.
Felice Leonardo, 100, Italian Roman Catholic prelate, Bishop of Cerreto Sannita-Telese-Sant'Agata de' Goti (1957–1991).
Alexander Nadson, 88, Belarusian religious leader, Apostolic Visitor for Belarusian Greek-Catholic faithful abroad (since 1986).
Luis Ortega Álvarez, 62, Spanish judge, member of the Constitutional Court of Spain (since 2011), heart attack.
Govindbhai Patel, 72, Indian filmmaker, cancer.
Margo Reed, 73, American jazz musician, complications from dementia.
Mykola Storozhenko, 86, Ukrainian painter.
Barbara Strauch, 63, American author and reporter (The New York Times), breast cancer.
Surya Bahadur Thapa, 88, Nepalese politician, Prime Minister (1955, 1963–1964, 1965–1969, 1979–1983, 1997–1998, 2003–2004), respiratory failure.
Gunilla Wolde, 75, Swedish writer and illustrator.

16
Ron Bailey, 88, New Zealand politician, MP for Heretaunga (1960–1981).
Driss Bamous, 73, Moroccan Olympic footballer (1964).
Valery Belousov, 66, Russian ice hockey player and coach.
Ollie Brown, 71, American baseball player (San Diego Padres, San Francisco Giants), mesothelioma.
Attaphol Buspakom, 53, Thai football player and coach, blood infection.
Oles Buzina, 45, Ukrainian journalist, shot.
Bhola Nath Chalise, 63, Nepalese economist, kidney ailments.
Alden G. Glauch, 95, American air force  major general.
Tommy Graham, 72, Scottish politician.
Stanislav Gross, 45, Czech politician, Prime Minister (2004–2005), amyotrophic lateral sclerosis.
Johnny Kemp, 55, Bahamian singer ("Just Got Paid"), fall.
Heino Kleiminger, 76, German footballer (F.C. Hansa Rostock, East Germany national team), cancer.
Eduard Koblmueller, 69, Austrian mountaineer, hypothermia.
Nimal Mendis, 81, Sri Lankan singer and songwriter.
Tommy Preston, 82, Scottish footballer (Hibernian).
Lee Remmel, 90, American public relations director (Green Bay Packers).
Smuggler, 12, American Thoroughbred racehorse, complications from foaling.
Marjorie Elliott Sypher, 89, Canadian-born Costa Rican First Lady (1974–1978).
Giuseppe Zigaina, 91, Italian neorealist painter and author.

17
Renato Altissimo, 74, Italian politician, Minister of Health (1979–1980, 1981–1983), Minister of Trade and Industry (1983–1986).
Steve Beck, 58, English executive, chairman of York City F.C. (2003–2004).
Brian Couzens, 82, British music industry executive (Chandos Records).
Mariano Gago, 66, Portuguese physicist and politician, cancer.
Francis George, 78, American Roman Catholic Cardinal, Archbishop of Chicago (1997–2014), President of the Conference of Catholic Bishops (2007–2010), bladder cancer.
Peter Graham, 60, English cricketer.
Robert P. Griffin, 91, American politician, member of the U.S. Senate from Michigan (1966–1977) and House of Representatives from Michigan's 9th district (1957–1966).
Jaroslav Holík, 72, Czech ice hockey player, world champion (1972).
Viktor Korshunov, 85, Russian actor, People's Artist of the USSR.
Tore Bernitz Pedersen, 80, Norwegian cartoonist.
Hannes Lindemann, 92, German sailor.
Phil Lundgren, 75, British Olympic boxer.
Ray Nemec, 85, American baseball researcher and historian.
Scotty Probasco, 86, American businessman and philanthropist.
Don Quayle, 84, American broadcast journalist, President of NPR (1970–1973).
Jack Rieley, 72, American record producer and band manager (The Beach Boys).
Jeremiah J. Rodell, 93, American brigadier general and priest.
Keith Shackleton, 92, British painter and television presenter.
S. K. Sharma, 62, Indian cricket umpire.
Ann Stepan, 71, American politician, member of the Illinois House of Representatives (1991–1993), lymphoma.
A. Alfred Taubman, 91, American real estate developer, philanthropist and football team owner (Michigan Panthers).
Greg Woodcroft, 44, Canadian wrestler.

18
Sir Christopher Bayly, 69, British historian.
Walter Conahan, 87, American politician, member of the South Dakota Senate (1983–1989), cancer.
Francesco Dapiran, 94, Italian Olympic rower (1948).
Gunnar Gravdahl, 87, Norwegian politician, Mayor of Bærum (1989–1992).
Joe Hutter, 77, American politician, member of the Iowa House of Representatives.
Joseph Lechleider, 82, American inventor (DSL).
Sir Roger Lobo, 91, Macanese-born Hong Kong businessman and politician, senior unofficial member of the Legislative Council (1980–1985), moved "Lobo Motion" (1984), cancer.
Mario Pirani, 89, Italian journalist (la Repubblica), economist, and writer.
William Schultz, 76, New Zealand rugby league player (Eastern Suburbs, national team).
Laverne Torczon, 79, American football player.
Leonid Vladimirsky, 94, Russian book illustrator.
Erwin Waldner, 82, German footballer (VfB Stuttgart, SPAL Ferrara).
L. Jean Willoughby, 89, American politician.

19
Richard Anthony, 77, Egyptian-born French singer.
Sir Raymond Carr, 96, British historian.
Haney Catchings, 66, American football coach (Prairie View A&M, Tuskegee), cancer.
Uche Chukwumerije, 75, Nigerian politician, Senator for Abia North (since 2003), lung cancer.
Margot Duke, Marchioness of Reading, 96, British aristocrat.
William Price Fox, 89, American novelist.
Lothar Friedrich, 84, German cyclist.
Eva Galambos, 87, American politician, Mayor of Sandy Springs, Georgia (2005–2014), cancer.
Freddie Gray, 25, American police suspect, severed spinal cord.
Aliaskhab Kebekov, 43, Dagestani-Russian Islamist leader, Emir of the Caucasus Emirate (since 2014), shot.
Sandra Mackey, 77, American writer (Chicago Tribune, The Wall Street Journal).
István Marton, 72, Hungarian politician.
Roy Mason, Baron Mason of Barnsley, 91, British politician, MP for Barnsley (1953–1983) and Barnsley Central (1983–1987), Secretary of State for Northern Ireland (1976–1979).
Scott Mason, 55, American radio personality.
Tom McCabe, 60, Scottish politician, Minister for Finance and Public Service Reform (2004–2007).
Tony Morelli, 58, Canadian stunt performer (The X-Files, Smallville, Rise of the Planet of the Apes).
Hiroyuki Nishimoto, 88, Japanese voice actor (Moomin), aortic dissection.
Theodosia Okoh, 92, Ghanaian flag designer and sports administrator.
Michael J. D. Powell, 78, British mathematician.
Else Repål, 85, Norwegian politician.
Oktay Sinanoğlu, 80, Turkish scientist.
Bernard Stollman, 85, American record label founder (ESP-Disk), colon and spine cancer.
Elio Toaff, 99, Italian rabbi, Chief Rabbi of Rome (1951–2002).
Betty Willis, 91, American graphic designer (Welcome to Fabulous Las Vegas sign).
Casimir Witucki, 86, American football player (Washington Redskins).

20
Gilberto Almeida, 86, Ecuadorian painter.
Gary Brain, 72, New Zealand timpanist and conductor.
Doug Buffone, 70, American football player (Chicago Bears) and radio host.
Cláudio Cunha, 68, Brazilian actor.
Hassan El-Shazly, 71, Egyptian footballer (Tersana, national team).
Pedro Eugênio, 65, Brazilian politician, MP (1998–2014), complications from surgery.
Peter Howell, 96, British actor (Emergency – Ward 10, Shadowlands, The Prisoner).
Nobuo Kaiho, 73, Japanese Olympic basketball player.
Albert Kalonji, 85, Congolese politician, King of South Kasai.
Gábor Kucsera, 65, Hungarian Olympic swimmer.
Aharon Lichtenstein, 81, French-born American-Israeli rabbi, recipient of the Israel Prize (2014).
Bob Maloubier, 92, French secret agent.
Frederic Morton, 90, Austrian-born American writer.
Bob St. Clair, 84, American Hall of Fame football player (San Francisco 49ers).
Ibrahim Yusri, 65, Egyptian actor (The Terrorist), kidney failure.

21
M. H. Abrams, 102, American literary critic.
Mykola Bahrov, 77, Ukrainian academician and politician.
Steve Byrnes, 56, American sports announcer (NASCAR on Fox), head and neck cancer.
Gideon Eilat, 91, Israeli soldier.
Betsy von Furstenberg, 83, German-born American actress (As the World Turns) and baroness, Alzheimer's disease.
Edan Milton Hughes, 80, American art dealer and author.
Bakhtyar Khudojnazarov, 49, Tajik-Russian film director (Luna Papa).
Ferenc Konrád, 70, Hungarian water polo player, Olympic bronze (1968), silver (1972) and gold (1976) medalist.
Jim McCarthy, 90, Irish rugby union player (national team).
Sergei Mikhalev, 67, Russian ice hockey coach, traffic collision.
John Moshoeu, 49, South African footballer (Kaizer Chiefs, Giant Blackpool, national team), African Cup of Nations champion (1996), cancer.
Janaki Ballabh Patnaik, 88, Indian politician, Chief Minister of Odisha (1980–1989, 1995–1999), Governor of Assam (2009–2014), heart attack.
Robert P. Patterson, Jr., 91, American federal judge.
Borisav Pisić, 66, Bosnian Yugoslav Olympic hurdler (1980).
Sydney Valpy Radley-Walters, 95, Canadian WWII tank commander.
Abdel Rahman el-Abnudi, 76, Egyptian poet.
Derek Vonberg, 93, British physicist. (death announced on this date)
Dave Walker, 73, English footballer (Burnley, Southampton).
Elizabeth Weaver, 74, American judge, Michigan Supreme Court Justice (1995–2010), Chief Justice (1991–2001).
Cindy Yang, 24, Taiwanese model and actress (First of May), suicide by helium inhalation.

22
Hugh Alan Anderson, 81, Canadian politician.
Dick Balharry, 77, British conservationist, cancer.
Peter B. Best, 76, British marine mammal expert.
Dorothy Custer, 103, American comedian.
Yoichi Funado, 71, Japanese novelist, thymic cancer.
Régis Ghesquière, 65, Belgian Olympic decathlete (1972), heart attack.
Alasdair Graham, 85, Canadian politician, Senator for Nova Scotia (1972–2004).
Nagare Hagiwara, 62, Japanese actor, traffic collision.
Imtiaz Alam Hanfi, 86, Pakistani banker.
Ronny Lee, 88, American guitarist and writer.
Audree Norton, 88, American actress.
Bernard Penfold, 98, British army major general, general manager of the Royal Hong Kong Jockey Club (1972–1979).
Aideen O'Kelly, 74, Irish actress.
Páll Skúlason, 69, Icelandic philosopher.
Gennadi Vengerov, 55, Belarusian-born Soviet actor (Enemy at the Gates), lung and bone cancer.
Irene Woodall, 69, American magazine editor.

23
Afzaal Ahmed, 66, Pakistani cricketer and umpire.
Aziz Asli, 77, Iranian footballer (Persepolis).
Dick Barone, 82, American baseball player (Pittsburgh Pirates). 
Desmond Boal, 85, Northern Irish lawyer and politician, MP for Belfast Shankill (1960–1972).
Frana Cardno, 74, New Zealand politician, Mayor of Southland District (1992–2013), bile duct cancer.
Sir Philip Carter, 87, British football director (Everton).
Richard Corliss, 71, American film critic (Time), stroke.
Alexander Eliot, 95, American writer.
Marie Herbst, 86, American politician, Mayor of Vernon, Connecticut (1979–1986), member of the Connecticut Senate (1987–1992).
George Horner, 91, Czech-born American pianist and physician.
Ray Jackson, 74, Australian aboriginal activist and Wiradjuri elder.
Pierre Claude Nolin, 64, Canadian politician, Speaker of the Senate (since 2014), cancer.
Frank Porretta, 84, American tenor and musical theater actor.
Paul Ryan, 69, American actor, television host and correspondent (Entertainment Tonight), leukemia.
Jim Steffen, 78, American football player (Detroit Lions, Washington Redskins).
E. M. Subramaniam, 67, Indian Carnatic percussionist.
Sawyer Sweeten, 19, American actor (Everybody Loves Raymond), suicide by gunshot.
Francis Tsai, 48, American concept artist (Spider-Man, TMNT, The Bourne Conspiracy), amyotrophic lateral sclerosis.
Sixto Valencia Burgos, 81, Mexican comic artist (Memín Pinguín, MAD).
Guillermo Zúñiga Martínez, 72, Mexican academic and politician, Mayor of Xalapa (1988–1991), MP for Veracruz (1994–1997).

24
Władysław Bartoszewski, 93, Polish politician and resistance fighter, Auschwitz concentration camp prisoner, Minister of Foreign Affairs (1995, 2000–2001).
Ken Birch, 81, British footballer (Bangor City).
Thomas Joseph Connolly, 92, American Roman Catholic prelate, Bishop of Baker (1971–1999).
Rustum Ghazaleh, 61, Syrian military officer, head injury.
Ismail Hussain, 65, Indian politician, MP for Barpeta (2009–2014), cancer.
Horst-Peter Kretschmer, 59, German Olympic ice hockey player (1980, 1988).
Valentine Lamb, 76, British journalist (The Irish Field).
Frankie Lee, 73, American blues singer-songwriter.
Benjamin F. Logan, 87, American electrical engineer and bluegrass musician, heart attack.
Sabeen Mahmud, 39, Pakistani human rights activist, shot.
Michael Mustill, Baron Mustill, 83, British judge, barrister and peer.
Herbert Ninaus, 78, Austrian-born Australian international footballer.
Claudia Paz, 95, Chilean actress.
Max Rojas, 74, Mexican poet.
Raymond Roussin, 75, Canadian Roman Catholic prelate, Bishop of Gravelbourg (1995–1998) and Victoria (1999–2004), Archbishop of Vancouver (2004–2009).
Success Express, 30, American Thoroughbred racehorse.
Sid Tepper, 96, American songwriter ("Red Roses for a Blue Lady").
George C. Young, 98, American lawyer and judge, heart attack.

25
Karl-Otto Alberty, 81, German actor.
Colin Bloomfield, 33, British radio presenter (BBC Radio Derby), skin cancer.
Sujit Bose, 80, Indian cricketer.
Arthur Brittenden, 90, British newspaper editor (Daily Mail).
Wilfred Brown, 85, Australian cricketer.
Edward Coke, 7th Earl of Leicester, 78, British nobleman.
Jim Fanning, 87, American baseball player (Chicago Cubs) and manager (Montreal Expos).
Paolo Galletti, 78, Italian Olympic swimmer (1956, 1960).
Jiří Hledík, 86, Czech footballer (FC Hradec Králové).
Otakar Krámský, 55, Czech racing driver, triple European hillclimb champion (1995, 1997, 1998), training collision.
Don Mankiewicz, 93, American screenwriter (Star Trek, Ironside, Profiles in Courage), heart failure.
Ben Molar, 99, Argentine composer and musical producer.
Mike Phillips, 59, American basketball player (Kentucky Wildcats, FC Barcelona), fall.
Alfred Schreyer, 92, Ukrainian-born Polish fiddler and singer.
Christine Stewart, 74, Canadian politician, Secretary of State (1993–1997) and Minister of the Environment (1997–1999).
Richard West, 84, British journalist and author.
Notable deaths consequent to the April 2015 Nepal earthquake:
Dan Fredinburg, 33, American executive, head of privacy at Google.
Matthias Kuhle, 67, German geographer.

26
Masudur Rahman Baidya, 46, Indian swimmer, heart attack.
Talal Akbar Bugti, 63, Pakistani tribal leader and politician, heart attack.
Edward T. Chambers, 85, American activist, director of the Industrial Areas Foundation (1972–2009), heart failure.
Hojatollah Khatib, 61, Iranian sports administrator (Persepolis), cancer.
Izatullo Khayoyev, 78, Tajik politician, Vice-President (1990–1991), Prime Minister (1991–1992).
Jayne Meadows, 95, American actress (I've Got a Secret, Undercurrent, Song of the Thin Man).
Józef Paczyński, 95, Polish WWII prisoner, barber of Rudolf Hoss.
Marcel Pronovost, 84, Canadian Hall of Fame ice hockey player (Detroit Red Wings, Toronto Maple Leafs).
Bill Valentine, 82, American baseball umpire.
*Wang Guozhen, 58, Chinese poet, liver cancer.

27
Jay Appleton, 95, British geographer.
Randy Bennett, 51, Canadian swimming coach, cancer.
Suzanne Crough, 52, American actress (The Partridge Family), arrhythmogenic right ventricular dysplasia.
David Fletcher, 90, English cricketer (Surrey).
Gene Fullmer, 83, American professional boxer, two-time middleweight world champion.
Verne Gagne, 89, American professional wrestler, trainer and promoter (AWA), Hall of Fame (2004, 2006).
Frank Henderson, 92, American politician, member of the Idaho House of Representatives (2004–2014).
Guy LeBlanc, 54, Canadian keyboard player (Nathan Mahl, Camel), kidney cancer.
Andrew Lesnie, 59, Australian cinematographer (The Lord of the Rings, I Am Legend, The Water Diviner), Oscar winner (2002), heart attack.
Harvey R. Miller, 82, American lawyer, amyotrophic lateral sclerosis.
Marty Napoleon, 93, American jazz pianist.
Lionel Repka, 80, Canadian ice hockey player (Fort Wayne Komets), liver cancer.
Alexander Rich, 90, American biologist.
Inês Etienne Romeu, 72, Brazilian political prisoner.
Abraham Rotstein, 86, Canadian economist.
Rolf Smedvig, 62, American classical trumpeter (Empire Brass), heart attack.
Chris Turner, 64, English football player and manager (Peterborough).
John Wimpenny, 92, English aeronautical engineer.

28
Antônio Abujamra, 82, Brazilian actor and director.
Marcia Brown, 96, American writer and children's books illustrator.
Duri Camichel, 32, Swiss ice hockey player (EV Zug), traffic collision.
Glenn Dennis, 90, American ufologist.
Jack Ely, 71, American singer ("Louie Louie").
René Féret, 69, French actor and director (Solemn Communion).
Ashura Hara, 68, Japanese professional wrestler, pneumonia.
Keith Harris, 67, British ventriloquist (Orville the Duck, Cuddles the Monkey), cancer.
Michael J. Ingelido, 98, American Air Force major general, stroke.
Yoshihiko Osaki, 76, Japanese swimmer, Olympic silver medalist (1960), pneumonia.
Vicente Piccio, Jr., 83, Filipino Air Force major general.
Einar Thorsteinn, 73, Icelandic architect.
James Watson, 78, British novelist.
Xu Guangxian, 94, Chinese chemist.

29
Charles Benton, 84, American public digital media promoter, CEO of the Benton Foundation, cancer.
Carlos Calderón Fajardo, 69, Peruvian journalist and novelist.
Giovanni Canestri, 96, Italian Roman Catholic prelate, Archbishop of Cagliari (1984–1987) and Genoa (1987–1995).
Daniel During, 83, South African cricketer.
Gopulu, 90, Indian cartoonist (Ananda Vikatan).
Nicholas Gruner, 72, Canadian Roman Catholic priest, promoter of the message of Our Lady of Fatima, heart attack.
John G. Heyburn II, 66, American federal judge, Chief District Court Judge for the Western District of Kentucky (2001–2008), liver cancer.
Paul Hudak, 62, American professor of computer science, leukemia.
Milap Chand Jain, 86, Indian judge and politician, Governor of Rajasthan (1990).
Gary Liddell, 60, Scottish footballer (Grimsby Town, Heart of Midlothian).
Valmir Louruz, 71, Brazilian football manager (Juventude, Pelotas).
François Michelin, 88, French businessman, CEO of Michelin (1955–1999).
Vardan Militosyan, 64, Armenian Olympic silver medallist weightlifter (1976).
Jean Nidetch, 91, American businesswoman, founder of Weight Watchers.
Calvin Peete, 71, American golfer, Tournament Players champion (1985).
Philip Perlman, 95, American businessman and actor (Cheers).
Joe Pikula, 70, Canadian football player (Hamilton Tiger-Cats).
Barbara Reynolds, 100, English scholar, lexicographer and translator.
Brian Sedgemore, 78, British politician, fall.
Dan Walker, 92, American politician, Governor of Illinois (1973–1977), heart failure.
Notable convicted drug traffickers executed by Indonesian firing squad:
Andrew Chan, 31, Australian (Bali Nine)
Rodrigo Gularte, 42, Brazilian
Myuran Sukumaran, 34, Australian (Bali Nine)

30
Lennart Bodström, 87, Swedish politician, Minister for Foreign Affairs (1982–1985).
Sharon Callahan, 63, American Olympic athlete.
Bold Pilot, 22, Turkish thoroughbred racehorse.
Halina Daniec, 66, Polish Olympic gymnast.
Peter Dobkin Hall, 69, American author and historian, traffic collision.
David Fonseca, 60, Belizean politician, Mayor of Belize City (1999–2006), suicide by gunshot.
Adrian Gibson, 79, Australian politician, MP for Denison (1964–69).
Steven Goldmann, 53, Canadian music video and film director, cancer.
Rutger Gunnarsson, 69, Swedish bassist (ABBA, Elton John).
Ben E. King, 76, American soul and R&B singer ("Stand by Me"), coronary heart disease.
Gregory Mertens, 24, Belgian footballer, heart attack.
Patachou, 96, French singer and actress.
William Pfaff, 86, American author and columnist, heart attack.
Ronald Senator, 89, British composer, house fire.
Sky Classic, 28, Canadian Thoroughbred racehorse.
Nigel Terry, 69, British actor (The Lion in Winter, Excalibur, Troy), emphysema.

References

2015-04
 04